Nader Fereydouni (born in 1962 in Firouzabad, Iran) is an Iranian politician. He is a Member of the ninth term of the Islamic Parliament of Iran. He served as Chairman of the Parliamentary Committee on Oil and Energy and as a member of Iran-Britain Parliamentary Friendship Group.

References

Political office-holders in Iran
1962 births
Living people
Members of the 9th Islamic Consultative Assembly